Khitish Chandra Mondal (13 October 1939 – 9 March 2020) was a Bangladesh Awami League politician. He served as the Minister of Relief and Rehabilitation in the Third Sheikh Mujib cabinet.

Birth and early life 
Khitish Chandra Mondal was born on 13 October 1939 in Pirojpur District.

Death 
Khitish Chandra Mondal died on 9 March 2020.

References

1939 births
2020 deaths
People from Pirojpur District
Awami League politicians
1st Jatiya Sangsad members
Bangladesh Krishak Sramik Awami League central committee members